Papilio polymnestor, the blue Mormon, is a large swallowtail butterfly found in south India and Sri Lanka. It is the "state butterfly" of the Indian state of Maharashtra. With a wingspan of 120–150 mm, it is the fourth largest butterfly of India.

Description

Males have the upper wings rich velvety black. The forewing has a postdiscal band composed of internervular broad blue streaks gradually shortened and obsolescent anteriorly, not extended beyond interspace 6.

The hindwing has the terminal three-fourths beyond a line crossing the apical third of the cell pale blue, or greyish blue, with superposed postdiscal, subterminal and terminal series of black spots—the postdiscal spots elongate, inwardly conical; the subterminal oval, placed in the interspaces, the terminal irregular, placed along the apices of the veins and anteriorly coalescing more or less with the subterminal spots.

The underside is black with and on the base of the cell in the forewing is an elongate spot of dark red; the postdiscal transverse series of streaks as on the upperside but grey tinged with ochraceous and extended right up to the costa; in some specimens similar but narrow streaks also in the cell. Hindwing with five irregular small patches of red at base, the outer three-fourths of the wing grey touched with ochraceous, but generally narrower than the blue on the upperside; the inner margin of the grey area crosses the wing beyond the cell; the postdiscal and subterminal black spots as on the upperside. In some specimens this grey area is greatly restricted, its inner margin crossing the wing well beyond the apex of the cell; the subterminal spots merged completely with the terminal spots and form a comparatively broad terminal black band. Antennae, head, thorax and abdomen blackish brown.

Female is very similar but the internervular streaks on the forewing paler, extended into the cell both on the upper and undersides. Hindwing: the pale blue area on the upperside and the corresponding grey area on the underside paler. In some specimens there is a diffuse short crimson streak at the base of the cell of the forewing on the upperside.

Distribution
This species is endemic to India and Sri Lanka. In India it is restricted to the Western Ghats, Southern India and the east coast. It has been recorded as far north as Gujarat. It is often seen even in the gardens and sometimes in the middle of busy traffic in large cities such as Mumbai, Pune and Bangalore. Mark Alexander Wynter-Blyth recorded it in Madhya Pradesh, Jharkhand, West Bengal, Sikkim and Kerala.

Status
It is common and not thought to be threatened. It occurs throughout the year but more common in the monsoon and immediately after it.

In Sri Lanka, populations of Papilio polymnestor have expanded due to the increased availability of its food plants (family Rutaceae) due to modification of landscapes and in particular cultivation of Citruses.

Habitat

The butterfly is most common in heavy rainfall areas, such as evergreen forests. It is also common in deciduous forests and wooded urban areas, primarily due to the cultivation of its host plants, i.e. the Citrus species.

Habits

This butterfly frequents forest paths and streams. The male is fond of sun and avoids the shade. It frequents flowers especially of Mussaenda frondosa, Ixora coccinea, Jasminum species and Asystasia gangetica. Periodically raids thicker forest patches, especially where Atalantia species are to be found in search of females to mate with. Has a rapid unidirectional flight and frequently changes course, hopping up and down in its flight path. Difficult to catch. Known to bask in the sun. Attracted to damp patch and has greater tolerance to other butterflies and humans while lapping up the mineral rich moisture. Known to visit animal droppings.

The blue Mormon has been recorded as a pollinator of cardamom (Elettaria cardamomum). It is known to mud-puddle.

Life cycle

Eggs
The eggs are laid singly on the upper surfaces of the leaves on rutaceous plants at ten feet or so above the ground. The newly laid egg is spherical and light green but darkens over time to orange yellow.

Caterpillar
The newborn caterpillar makes the eggshell its first meal and then rests on a silken bed that it spins for itself near the edge of a leaf. The little caterpillar mimics a bird dropping with its olive green body and white uric acid-like markings. The sheen enhances its resemblance to fresh bird dropping. While small in size, this camouflage permits the caterpillar to rest on the centre of a leaf and nibble around the edges. Later its growing size forces it to keep to twigs and the undersides of leaves except when it is feeding on leaves. It moves slowly and haltingly. It has a unique habit of securing its balance by weaving silk on the substratum.

The caterpillar can be distinguished from the common Mormon, which it resembles, by its larger size, greenish head and a blue streak in the eyespot in segments 4 to 5. It has a deep red osmeterium.

Pupa
The pupa also resembles that of the common Mormon but is much larger and can be easily distinguished by the prominent folds on the lower side of the abdominal protrusion.

Food plants
The larva have been recorded to feed on small rutaceous forest trees and large shrubs. The list of host plants includes:
 Atalantia racemosa and Atalantia wightii
 Glycosmis arborea
 Paramigyna monophylla
 Citrus grandis
 Citrus limon
 Aegle marmelos
 Other Citrus cultivars.

Recognition
In June 2015, the Blue Mormon was declared as the 'State Butterfly' of the state of Maharashtra and became the first state in India to have a 'State Butterfly'.

See also
List of butterflies of India (Papilionidae)

References
8. Moinuddin (2015). Student of Department of Physics of University of Dhaka.

General reading

 
 
 
 
 
 

polymnestor
Butterflies of Asia
Butterflies described in 1775
Taxa named by Pieter Cramer
Symbols of Maharashtra